Churchill Fulshear, Jr. High School is a senior high school in the LCISD Education Center in Fulshear, Texas, and in the Houston metropolitan area. The school, which serves the LCISD portion of Fulshear, Weston Lakes, and Simonton, is a part of the Lamar Consolidated Independent School District (LCISD). The school's namesake was a part of the Fulshear family, one of the first Anglo white families to settle Texas, and fought in the Texas Revolution.

It is the first high school to primarily serve Fulshear.

History
The district bought the land for it in 2008.

PBK Architects was hired as the architectural firm.

The school opened in the fall of 2016 with grades 9 and 10, and over the following two years will add grades 11 and 12. The first principal is Daniel Ward. The dedication ceremony occurred in December of that year.

Athletics
The school's first athletic director and American football coach, Oschlor Flemming, previously worked at Dulles High School as the head football coach and Guyer High School in Denton, Texas as the assistant football coach. In 2018, the Fulshear football team began playing at the varsity level.

Band 
The Fulshear High School Charger Band has made tremendous strides in its first year. Over the course of the fall 2016 season, the marching band has won 7 awards: 2 in "Best Percussion/Drumline in Class 4A", 2 in "Outstanding Soloist in Class 4A", 1 in "Outstanding Drum Major(s) in Class 4A", and 2 Class 1 Superior rankings. The band also sent 2 members to the ATSSB (Association of Texas Small School Bands) All-State Band: 1 Jazz Percussionist, and 1 Concert Oboist two years in a row. In the Spring of 2017, 9 members advanced to State Solo and Ensemble Competition. 5 of which were percussionists, the other 4, a woodwind ensemble with the bassoonist advancing on both Solo and Ensemble, along with three percussionists doing the same. The school is set to host the LCISD Pre-UIL Competition and mixed district UIL (University Interscholastic League) Competition for Non-Varsity bands later this spring. In the Fall of 2018, they continued their streak of “1” rank at UIL, and continued to area. At area, they finished 7th overall in Prelims and 2nd in finals, moving them to state. At state, they finished 4th in the preliminary round, and placed 10th overall in finals.

References

External links
 

Lamar Consolidated Independent School District high schools
2016 establishments in Texas
Educational institutions established in 2016